The vocal tract is the cavity in human bodies and in animals where the sound produced at the sound source (larynx in mammals; syrinx in birds) is filtered.

In birds it consists of the trachea, the syrinx, the oral cavity, the upper part of the esophagus, and the beak. In mammals it consists of the laryngeal cavity, the pharynx, the oral cavity, and the nasal cavity.

The estimated average length of the vocal tract in men is 16.9 cm and 14.1 cm in women.

See also 
Language
Talking birds – species of birds capable of imitating human sounds, but without known comprehension
Speech organ
Speech synthesis
Manner of articulation

References 

Human head and neck
Human voice